Gowtham Sundararajan is an Indian actor and choreographer who has worked on Tamil-language films and in television dramas.

Career
Gowtham Sundararajan was born to Tamil actor Major Sundarrajan and Shyamala in Madras, Tamil Nadu. He studied at Vivekananda College and graduated in 1989, before attempting to make a breakthrough in the film industry by appearing in item numbers, featuring in various projects including K. Balachander's Azhagan (1990). He married Kokila Hariram in September 1996. In 1998, along with his wife, he founded the Academy of Modern Dance, Chennai's first formal Western dance school. The pair also worked on choreographing for films, with their biggest venture being their first film, the Kamal Haasan-starrer Aalavandhan (2001). They continued to work on other film projects including the incomplete R. Madhavan-Jyothika starrer Acham Thavir, which they travelled to Syria to shoot.

Gowtham then began a career in acting, notably starring as one of Tamizhselvan's aides in Mani Ratnam's Iruvar (1997). As an actor, he mostly appeared in the films of Sundar C. and Arjun Sarja. His inability to make it as a leading actor in films, saw him also pursue a career in television while appearing in supporting roles in films. He turned producer alongside Sundar C for the film, Ainthaam Padai (2009).

In 2016, his first directorial project, Kannula Kaasa Kattappa starring Aravind Akash, Ashwathy Warrier and Chandini Tamilarasan, was released.

Selected filmography
Actor

Director
Kannula Kaasa Kattappa (2016)

Television

References

External links

Indian male film actors
Tamil male actors
Male actors from Chennai
Living people
Indian choreographers
Male actors in Tamil cinema
Film directors from Chennai
Tamil film directors
20th-century Indian male actors
21st-century Indian male actors
Year of birth missing (living people)
Tamil male television actors